Derbent Dam is a gravity/embankment dam on the Kızılırmak River in Samsun Province, Turkey. The development was backed by the Turkish State Hydraulic Works.

See also

List of dams and reservoirs in Turkey

External links
DSI, State Hydraulic Works (Turkey), Retrieved December 16, 2009

Dams in Samsun Province
Hydroelectric power stations in Turkey
Dams completed in 1990
Dams on the Kızılırmak River
Kızılırmak